Anne-Lise Caudal (born 26 June 1984) is a French professional golfer.

Caudal has won two tournaments on the Ladies European Tour, the 2008 Ladies Open of Portugal and the 2012 Ladies German Open, where she beat Laura Davies in a playoff. She also finished runner-up at the 2008 Tenerife Ladies Open after losing a playoff to Rebecca Hudson, and at the 2009 European Nations Cup, representing France together with Gwladys Nocera.

An opening round of 69 at the 2010 Women's British Open had her tied for third spot, one stroke behind Katherine Hull and tournament winner Yani Tseng, before finishing tied 31st, her best result at a major.

Amateur wins
2005 French International Ladies Amateur Championship

Professional wins (4)

Ladies European Tour wins (2)

Ladies European Tour playoff record (1–1)

LET Access Series wins (1)
2011 La Nivelle Ladies Open

Sunshine Ladies Tour wins (1)

Source:

Team appearances
Amateur
European Lady Junior's Team Championship (representing France): 2004
Espirito Santo Trophy (representing France): 2004, 2006
European Ladies' Team Championship (representing France): 2005

Professional
European Nations Cup (representing France): 2009

References

External links

French female golfers
Ladies European Tour golfers
Mediterranean Games medalists in golf
Mediterranean Games silver medalists for France
Mediterranean Games bronze medalists for France
Competitors at the 2005 Mediterranean Games
Sportspeople from Pyrénées-Atlantiques
1984 births
Living people
21st-century French women